Notable Uruguayan musicians and singers.

Past

César Amaro (1948–2012)
Francisco Canaro (1888–1964)
José Carbajal (1943–2010)
Abel Carlevaro (1916–2001)
Luis Cluzeau Mortet (1888–1957)
Ramón Collazo (1901–1981)
Eduardo Fabini (1882–1950)
Osvaldo Fattoruso (1948–2012)
Jorge Galemire (1951–2015)
Rina Massardi (1897–1979)
Eduardo Mateo (1940–1990)
Gerardo Matos Rodríguez (1897–1948)
Osiris Rodríguez Castillos (1925–1996)
Guido Santórsola (1904–1994)
Julio Sosa (1926–1964)
Héctor Tosar (1923–2002)
Dinorah Varsi (1939–2013)
Alfredo Zitarrosa (1936–1989)

Present

Ethel Afamado (born 1940)
Alejandro Balbis
Washington Benavides
Mario Carrero
Jorge Drexler
Francisco Fattoruso
Hugo Fattoruso
Eduardo Fernández 
Julio Frade
Enrique Graf
Mariana Ingold
Eduardo Larbanois
Pitufo Lombardo (born 1966)
Martín López
Leo Maslíah
Martín Méndez
Pablo Minoli
Luciana Mocchi (born 1990)
Numa Moraes
Malena Muyala
Samantha Navarro
Gustavo Núñez
Roberto Perera
Álvaro Pierri
Renée Pietrafesa
Rubén Rada
Federico Ramos
Alberto Reyes
Jaime Roos
Gabe Saporta
Marco Sartor
Erwin Schrott
Pablo Sciuto
José Serebrier
Dani Umpi
Daniel Viglietti
Gonzalo Yáñez

See also

 List of Uruguayans
 Lists of musicians

 
Musicians
Uruguay